Barry University School of Adult and Continuing Education – Tallahassee Campus is branch campus of Barry University and is located on the campus of Tallahassee Community College in Tallahassee, Florida.

Academics 
The Barry University campus in Tallahassee offers Bachelor of Science degrees in: 
 Legal Studies designed to provide a broad background in fundamental legal studies to students who desire to become paralegals or legal assistants working under the supervision of a lawyer.
 Professional Administration designed to prepare the student with the administrative and leadership skills needed in all organizations - private, public, or non-profit - in order to successfully fulfill their missions and achieve their goals.
 Public Administration for professional employment in general public administration and is highly desirable for most of the special applications such as police, fire and planning.
 Information Technology for specializing in information systems administration, telecommunications, Network and systems engineering, software engineering
 A Certificate Program in Health Services for entry and middle management positions in such areas as hospitals, medical or dental clinics, group medical practices, managed care organizations, long-term care facilities, insurance companies, home health agencies, and government agencies. The curriculum emphasizes management skills for use in any health care setting.

External links 
 Barry University at Tallahassee
 Barry University

Barry University
Education in Tallahassee, Florida
Educational institutions established in 1940
Universities and colleges in Leon County, Florida
1940 establishments in Florida